The following is a list of stations found within the Shenyang Metro.

Line 1

Line 2

Line 9

Line 10

References

Shenyang Metro
Shenyang
Shenyang